Forward compatibility or upward compatibility is a design characteristic that allows a system to accept input intended for a later version of itself. The concept can be applied to entire systems, electrical interfaces, telecommunication signals, data communication protocols, file formats, and programming languages. A standard supports forward compatibility if a product that complies with earlier versions can "gracefully" process input designed for later versions of the standard, ignoring new parts which it does not understand.

The objective for forward compatible technology is for old devices to recognise when data has been generated for new devices.

Forward compatibility for the older system usually means backward compatibility for the new system, i.e. the ability to process data from the old system; the new system usually has full compatibility with the older one, by being able to both process and generate data in the format of the older system.

Forward compatibility is not the same as extensibility. A forward compatible design can process at least some of the data from a future version of itself. An extensible design makes upgrading easy. An example of both design ideas can be found in web browsers. At any point in time, a current browser is forward compatible if it gracefully accepts a newer version of HTML. Whereas how easily the browser code can be upgraded to process the newer HTML determines how extensible it is.

Examples

Telecommunication standards
The introduction of FM stereo transmission, or color television, allowed forward compatibility, since monophonic FM radio receivers and black-and-white TV sets still could receive a signal from a new transmitter. It also allowed backward compatibility since new receivers could receive monophonic or black-and-white signals generated by old transmitters.

Video gaming
 The Game Boy is able to play certain games released for the Game Boy Color. These games utilize the same cartridge design as games for the original Game Boy, though the plastic used is typically black rather than gray and feature the GBC's logo on the label and packaging; Nintendo officially referred to such titles as being "Dual Mode".
 The Leapster is able to play Leapster L-Max games.
 The Leapster L-Max is able to play Leapster2 games.
 The original PlayStation is compatible with the DualShock 2 controller. Likewise the PlayStation 3 can be played with a DualShock 4 controller.
The Neo Geo Pocket was able to play most games from Neo Geo Pocket Color.
The WonderSwan is able to play some WonderSwan Color games.
The Xbox One can use the controller from the Xbox Series X and Xbox Series S, and in contrast, an Xbox One controller will work on the Xbox Series X and Series S.

HTML
HTML is designed to treat all tags in the same way (as inert, unstyled inline elements) unless their appearance or behavior is overridden; either by the browser's default settings, or by scripts or styles included in the page. This makes most new features degrade gracefully in older browsers. One case where this did not work as intended was script and style blocks, whose content is meant to be interpreted by the browser instead of being part of the page. Such cases were dealt with by enclosing the content within comment blocks.

Because there is no mandatory upgrade of computers or web browsers, many web developers use a graceful degradation or progressive enhancement approach, attempting to make newly-created websites that are usable by people who have turned off Javascript or who have old computers or old web browsers or on a slow connection, yet still taking advantage of faster hardware and better JavaScript support in more modern web browsers, when available.

Optical media
Each of the three most common 12 cm optical media formats (CD, DVD, and Blu-ray) was first released in read-only form years before writable forms were available.  Within each format, there is both forward and backward compatibility, in that most older read-only drives and players can read (but not write) writable media in the same format, while read/write drives can read (but not write) old read-only media.  There is no forward compatibility between formats; a CD player, for instance, can't read a DVD (a newer format), not even the audio tracks.  There may be backward compatibility for better marketability (such as a DVD player playing an audio CD), but it is not intrinsic to the standards.

NUC (not upwardly compatible)

Some products are not designed to be forward compatible, which has been referred to as NUC (not upwardly compatible). In some cases this might be intentional by the designers as a form of vendor lock-in or software regression.

For example, a cubicle producer considers changing their cubicle design.  One designer promotes changing the footprint from 4 foot square to 1.2 meter square.  Immediately, the sales manager calls "NUC" and the problem is understood: if the footprint changes and existing customers are considering buying more from the producer, they will have to fit a different sized unit in an office designed for the 4 foot square cubicle.

Planned obsolescence is a type of upward compatibility, but rather than adopting a policy of backwards compatibility, companies adopt a commercial policy of backwards incompatibility so that newer apps require newer devices.

See also

 Backward compatibility
 Bug compatibility, backward compatibility that maintains the known flaws
 Computer compatibility
 Downcycling
 Future proofing
 Repurposing

References

External links
 Rule of Extensibility: Design for the future, because it will be here sooner than you think, in The Art of Unix Programming

Backward compatibility
Interoperability